WTOJ (103.1 FM) is an adult contemporary music radio station in Carthage, New York. The station plays music from the 1980s, 1990s, and 2000s. The station is known as "Magic 103.1".

Station history
The station first went onto air in 1983. The station has always had an adult contemporary since it signed on.

Magic 103.1's local on-air staff as of 2017 were Ally Payne (mid-days) and Ken Martin (afternoons), with the station programming syndicated programming from John Tesh (mornings) and Delilah (nights). Martin is also the Program Director for the station and also acts as the Production Manager for the cluster of stations owned by Community Broadcasters.

Magic 103.1 also carries syndicated programming on the weekend, including American Top 40: The 80s (Saturday 3 PM), Retro Pop Reunion with Joe Cortez (Saturday 7 PM) and American Top 40: The 70's (Sunday 9 AM). Ken Martin had also converted the mono editions of American Top 40 from its first three years to true stereo for Premiere Radio Networks' American Top 40: The 70s.

References

External links

TOJ
Mainstream adult contemporary radio stations in the United States